Tutufa (Tutufella) boholica is a species of sea snail, a marine gastropod mollusk in the family Bursidae, the frog shells.

Description
The shell size varies between 75mm and 120 mm

Distribution
This species is found along the Philippines.

References

External links
 

Bursidae
Gastropods described in 1987